Puerto Escondido is a town and municipality located in the Córdoba Department, northern Colombia.

History
In 1854 the Casimiro brothers, Máximo, José Blas and Nicomedes Díaz, arrived from Barú and settled in the place that today is known as Puerto Escondido Viejo. Another family named Barrios, also from the island of Barú, near Cartagena, attracted by the stories that the sailors kept about the fertility of these lands and the goodness of their inhabitants, came to settle in these places.

As the population increased, they decided to move their ranches to the site that today is called the Simón Bolívar neighbourhood, because it is near a lagoon that supplies water to the community. Puerto Escondido, the new one, became the main hamlet on this coast, for which the Assembly of the Department of Bolívar erected it as a district of the municipality of Lorica by Ordinance No. 42 of April 27, 1923.

By Ordinance No. 53 of April 24, 1928, the Bolívar Assembly clarified that the town of Puerto Escondido comprised the hamlets or aggregations of Yuca, Mangle, Alta Clara, Tierra Adentro, Agua Viva, Palmar, Morindó and Puerto Escondido.

References
 Gobernacion de Cordoba - Puerto Escondido
 Puerto Escondido official website

Municipalities of Córdoba Department
Populated places established in 1854